Fonds-des-Nègres is a commune in the Miragoâne Arrondissement, in the Nippes department of Haiti.

Climate

References

Populated places in Nippes
Communes of Haiti